Ring-cupped oak or ring-cup oak may refer to:

Quercus glauca, an oak species native to eastern and southern Asia
Oaks belonging to Quercus sect. Cyclobalanopsis